Mobiola is a wide range of software by SHAPE Services.

Overview 
Mobiola Video Studio is a video converter of movies, DVDs, YouTube, Metacafe, Google Videos to the video format appropriate for the iPhone, iPod Touch, iPad, BlackBerry, Windows Mobile, Symbian, Java MIDP 2.0, Palm, Android, and Sony PSP devices. Mobiola Video Studio supports automatic discovery of mobile device model and drag-and-drop of videos from DVD or browser to device.
Mobiola xPlayer is a multimedia player for BlackBerry with the support of mp3, m4a, avi, mp4, 3gp, wma, amr, mid, wav, aac, wmv file formats. It also supports live radio stations, podcasts, themes, BlackBerry Inbox integration and push notifications.
Mobiola Web Camera is a mobile software that transforms BlackBerry, Windows Mobile, Symbian smartphones into a mobile wireless webcam. Mobiola Web Camera is a two-part application. One part must be installed onto a Microsoft Windows compatible PC or a Mac OS X machine, and the other part onto an iPhone, BlackBerry, Windows Mobile or Symbian smartphone. These parts can be connected via Bluetooth, cable USB or Wi-Fi connection. Users of Mobiola Web Camera can use their phones as web cameras and receive video stream in various applications and services on PC such as Skype, Yahoo!, YouTube, MSN/Windows Live, AOL IM, ICQ and others.
Mobiola Headset allows recording of Skype, MSN/Windows Live, Yahoo!, Google Talk, AOL IM, ICQ, YouTube, MagicJack and other VoIP application calls and transforms iPhone, iPod Touch into a PC headset. Users must install Mobiola Headset Desktop to Windows PC which connects through Wi-Fi the Mobiola Headset app on iPhone, iPod Touch or iPad.
Mobiola Snapshot allows to make snapshots of BlackBerry screen in most applications. Options allow to choose the image quality and format.
Mobiola Message Ringtone sets a custom ring tone individually for each contact, incoming SMS or e-mail on BlackBerry.

See also
IM+ Messenger - a multiclient and multiplatform mobile instant messenger
Skype - Skype VoIP program
MSN Messenger - MSN instant messenger
Yahoo! Messenger - Yahoo! instant messenger

External links

SHAPE Services developer of this application

Mobile software
Webcams